Oronzo Vito Gasparo (1903–1969), was an American artist often known
for surreal townscape painting, design, and crafts.

Background 
Oronzo Vito Gasparo was born in Rutigliano, Bari, Italy in 1903, one of seventeen children. His parents were Italian and Hindu. He spent many active years in California, and died in New York City in 1969.

Gasparo studied at the National Academy of Design in New York; he was mentored by Preston Dickinson and was Dickinson's favorite pupil.

Early years 
Oronzo Vito Gasparo worked under the Works Progress Administration Easel Project during the Great Depression.

A number of Gasparo's works were acquired by Onya La Tour, who was an avid collector and enthusiast of modern art in New York in the 1930s, and who directed the Federal Art Gallery of the Federal Arts Project of the Work Projects Administration, 225 W 57th St, New York NY.

Work 
During his lifetime he had over 40 one-man shows ranging from 1928 to a retrospective in 1974.

Methods 
Designer
Painting

Mediums 
 Gouache
 Mixed-Media/Multi-Media
 Oil
 Watercolor

Styles 
 Surrealism

Subjects 
 Architecture/Buildings
 Figure
 Genre (Human Activity)
 Spanish Missions
 Townscape

Exhibitions 
Art Institute of Chicago
Carnegie Institute
Corcoran Gallery
Museum of Modern Art, New York
Pennsylvania Academy
Salons of America
Society of Independent Artists
Whitney Museum of American Art

Trivia 
 Gasparo was an avid dancer and claimed to have brought the rumba to New York.

References

Books

Museums
 Butler Institute of American Art
 Michelson Museum of Art
 Sheldon Memorial Art Gallery

Article
AskART

Notes

American atheists
Works Progress Administration workers
1903 births
1969 deaths